Panic was a bi-monthly humor comic that was published by Bill Gaines' EC Comics line during the mid-1950s as a companion to Harvey Kurtzman's Mad, which was being heavily imitated by other comic publishers.

Panic was edited by Al Feldstein (who became the editor of Mad a few years later). Beginning with its first issue (February–March 1954), Panic had a 12-issue run over two years. Feldstein was the primary cover artist, with stories illustrated by Jack Davis, Will Elder, Jack Kamen, Joe Orlando, Basil Wolverton and Wally Wood.  Some story ideas were by Nick Meglin, later the co-editor of Mad. Scripts were by Feldstein, Elder and Jack Mendelsohn, later a co-screenwriter of Yellow Submarine (1968) and an Emmy-nominated TV comedy writer.

EC dubbed Panic the "only authorized imitation" of Mad, but Mad'''s creator didn't enjoy the joke.  Almost thirty years later, Harvey Kurtzman told an interviewer, "Panic was another sore point. Gaines, by some convoluted reasoning, decided to double the profit of Mad by doing a Feldstein version of Mad and he just plundered all of my techniques and artists. For this there was a real conflict of interests."

First Issue Controversy
The publication was immediately controversial, as detailed by Steve Stiles in his article,"It's a Panic!":

Gaines later recalled, "The trouble we had on the Santa Claus story was Bill Elder. He had put a sign on the sleigh of Santa Claus, 'Just Divorced'.  Now how do a bunch of iconoclastic, atheist bastards like us know that Santa Claus is a saint and that he can't be divorced and that this is going to offend Boston?"  This didn't stop Gaines from later dressing in a Santa suit and posing for a Mad subscription offer as a benevolent gift giver (because the subscription rate was only a few cents cheaper than buying the issues at cover price).

As a result of the parody, Panic was ultimately banned from sale in the state of Massachusetts.  Gaines puckishly responded by issuing a press release announcing that as a "retaliatory measure," EC was pulling all copies of its Picture Stories from the Bible comic book out of Massachusetts.  It took the newspapers a few days to realize that the discontinued comic hadn't been on sale in Massachusetts, or anywhere else, in five years.

More legal hassles came EC's way because of another story from the first issue, a gory parody of Mickey Spillane's My Gun is the Jury that ended with one of Spillane's bombshell women revealed as a transvestite.  A few days after the Santa controversy in Massachusetts, EC's offices were raided by the New York City police.  Gaines' associate Lyle Stuart willingly took responsibility and was arrested; the charge was quickly thrown out of court.  In the meantime, abrasive gossip columnist Walter Winchell reported the story without mentioning that Stuart was released without result, and added, "Attention all newsstands!  Anyone selling the filth of Lyle Stuart will be subject to the same arrest!"  Winchell may have been motivated by "The Secret Life of Walter Winchell", a negative book based on a series of negative magazine articles about him written by Stuart, but his rhetoric cost him $21,500 after Stuart sued for libel.  Stuart used the money to start his own publishing house.

Differing viewsMad was quickly and widely imitated, to the point where creator and editor Harvey Kurtzman mocked his competitors' wave of copycat humor comic books in Mad's 17th issue.  But he was particularly unhappy with EC's own imitation.  "I was pretty bitter about it," Kurtzman said in 1965.  "The publisher and I got into a series of ever-increasing arguments going around in ever diminishing circles."

Publisher Gaines rejected Kurtzman's complaint, telling an interviewer decades later:
Sometimes Harvey loses sight of the fact that this was my business, that I was publishing these magazines, that one of my magazines was Mad, that I had a lot of other magazines making more or less profits, some of them none, and what's so immoral about me putting out another magazine imitating my own magazine? You see Harvey could never realize that Mad was mine; he thought it was his. [Laughter.] That was the basic problem. To me Mad was one of the EC Comics. If we put out The Vault of Horror and it's successful, what's wrong with putting out Tales From the Crypt? If we put out Mad and it's successful, what's wrong with putting out — all the time we put out Panic, Harvey felt we were competing with him, and I used to say, "Harvey, we're not competing with you, we're all one company. [Laughter.] The money comes from everywhere and it goes into a pot and from this pot we publish." Why am I competing?

And it was something that Harvey could never understand. He felt it was separate. The fact that 30 to 70 other people were imitating Mad, Martin Goodman had half a dozen, there were 70 titles I understand, my printer once counted them up, because he used to keep a list of all the comics published and he told me there were 70. I think he was wrong, but there were certainly 30, 40, or 50 imitations of Mad. You know, Eek, Ecch, Oook, Turn Blue was Shelly Mayer's, I can't even remember them all, Crazy, Cracked, Nutty, Silly, Woppy, Daffy, we got all these imitations of Mad, that's OK, but if I put out Panic it's immoral [laughter].

ReprintsPanic has been reprinted by publisher Russ Cochran several times. In 1985, it formed part of his Complete EC Library, published (in black and white) as a slipcased hardcover two-volume set. Panic was also reprinted issue-by-issue between March 1997 and December 1999 by Cochran (in association with Gemstone Publishing).  This complete run was later rebound, with covers included, in three softcover EC Annuals''. Dark Horse Comics subsequently published two hardback volumes of reprints as part of their EC Archives series, with volume 1 (issues 1 to 6) published in 2016 and volume 2 (issues 7 to 12) published in 2017.

Issue guide

References

External links
Christmas @ Ground Zero
RIP Lyle Stuart
Time (April 29, 2004): "The Glory and Horror of EC Comics" by Richard Corliss

Bimonthly magazines published in the United States
Satirical magazines published in the United States
Comics magazines published in the United States
Defunct magazines published in the United States
EC Comics publications
Magazines established in 1954
Magazines disestablished in 1956
1954 comics debuts
1956 comics endings